Augustus Frederick Keppel, 5th Earl of Albemarle (2 June 1794 – 15 March 1851), styled Viscount Bury from 1804 until 1849, was an English nobleman.

Life
Bury was commissioned an ensign in the 1st Regiment of Foot Guards on 7 April 1811. He was promoted to lieutenant and captain on 12 January 1814. In 1815, he was appointed aide-de-camp to William, Prince of Orange and fought at the Battle of Waterloo.

On 4 May 1816, Bury married Frances Steer, but the couple had no children. He sat as member of parliament for Arundel from 1820 to 1826, and was appointed a deputy lieutenant of Norfolk on 13 March 1845.

He succeeded his father as Earl of Albemarle in October 1849, but he was subsequently adjudged to have been insane since July 1849. Accordingly, he never sat in the House of Lords. Upon his death aged 56, in Chelsea, in 1851, he was succeeded by his brother George.

References

External links

1794 births
1851 deaths
British Army personnel of the Napoleonic Wars
Deputy Lieutenants of Norfolk
Augustus
Grenadier Guards officers
Augustus Keppel, 5th Earl of Albemarle
Bury, Augustus Keppel, Viscount
Bury, Augustus Keppel, Viscount
Albemarle, E5
Younger sons of earls